The 1939 National Invitation Tournament was the 1939 edition of the annual NCAA college basketball competition.

Selected teams
Below is a list of the six teams selected for the tournament.

 Bradley
 Long Island
 Loyola (IL)
 New Mexico A&M
 Roanoke
 St. John's

Bracket
Below is the tournament bracket.

See also 
 1939 NCAA basketball tournament
 1939 NAIA Basketball Tournament

References

National Invitation
National Invitation Tournament
1930s in Manhattan
National Invitation Tournament
National Invitation Tournament
Sports in Manhattan
College sports tournaments in New York City
Basketball competitions in New York City